Palla violinitens, the violet-banded palla, is a butterfly in the family Nymphalidae. It is found in Guinea, Sierra Leone, Liberia, Ivory Coast, Ghana, Benin, Nigeria, Cameroon, the Republic of the Congo, the Central African Republic, Angola, the Democratic Republic of the Congo and Uganda. The habitat consists of primary lowland evergreen forests.

The larvae feed on Bonomia poranoides and Clerodendron buchholzii.

Subspecies
Palla violinitens violinitens (Guinea, Sierra Leone, Liberia, Ivory Coast, Ghana, Benin, Nigeria)
Palla violinitens coniger (Butler, 1896) (eastern Nigeria, Cameroon, Congo, Central African Republic, Angola, Democratic Republic of the Congo)
Palla violinitens bwamba van Someren, 1975 (Democratic Republic of the Congo: Ituri Forest, Uganda: Bwamba Valley)

References

Butterflies described in 1890
Charaxinae
Butterflies of Africa